Konstantin Alexandrovich Barulin (born 4 September 1984) is a Russian professional ice hockey goaltender playing for Borås HC of the HockeyEttan in Sweden. He was born in Karaganda, Kazakh SSR, Soviet Union (now Kazakhstan), but plays internationally for Russia. He was drafted 84th overall by the St. Louis Blues in the 2003 NHL Entry Draft but remained in Russia and never signed a contract with the Blues.

Playing career
Barulin began his career with Gazovik Tyumen in 2001. He had a brief spell with SKA Saint Petersburg before returning to Gazovik. He went on to have spells at Spartak Moscow and Khimik Moscow Oblast before joining CSKA Moscow for the inaugural KHL season in 2008. On 29 July 2010, after two years with CSKA Barulin returned to Atlant signing as a free agent on a two-year contract. In 2012, he signed a three-year contract with Ak Bars Kazan.

After one season with Avangard Omsk in 2014–15, Barulin left as a free agent to sign an initial one-year deal with HC Sochi of the KHL on 28 May 2015.

Barulin remained as a standout starting goaltender in Sochi for four seasons. Following the 2018–19 season, Barulin left as a free agent to sign a one-year contract with Neftekhimik Nizhnekamsk on 2 May 2019.

During his second year with Neftekhimik in the midst of the 2020–21 season, with the club well out of playoff contention and having collected just 2 wins through 21 games, Barulin left the KHL and signed for the remainder of the season with Czech top flight club, HC Dyanmo Pardubice of the ELH, on 21 January 2021.

International play

Barulin represented Russia in the 2011 IIHF World Championship in which he defeated Team Canada 2–1, and in the 2012 IIHF World Championship where he helped team Russia en route to winning the gold medal.

Career statistics

Regular season and playoffs

International

Awards and honours

References

External links
 
 Konstantin Barulin profile at RussianProspects.com

1984 births
Living people
Ak Bars Kazan players
Avangard Omsk players
Atlant Moscow Oblast players
HC CSKA Moscow players
HC Dynamo Pardubice players
HC Neftekhimik Nizhnekamsk players
Russian ice hockey goaltenders
SKA Saint Petersburg players
St. Louis Blues draft picks
HC Sochi players
HC Spartak Moscow players
Sportspeople from Karaganda
Russian expatriate ice hockey people
Kazakhstani ice hockey goaltenders
Borås HC players
Kazakhstani expatriate ice hockey people
Expatriate ice hockey players in the Czech Republic
Expatriate ice hockey players in Sweden
Kazakhstani expatriate sportspeople in the Czech Republic
Kazakhstani expatriate sportspeople in Sweden
Russian expatriate sportspeople in the Czech Republic
Russian expatriate sportspeople in Sweden